Moore v. Texas, 137 S. Ct. 1039 (2017), is a United States Supreme Court decision about the death penalty and intellectual disability. The court held that contemporary clinical standards determine what an intellectual disability is, and held that even milder forms of intellectual disability may bar a person from being sentenced to death due to the Eighth Amendment's prohibition against cruel and unusual punishment. The case clarified two earlier cases, Atkins v. Virginia (2002) and Hall v. Florida (2014).

Background

Case background 
On April, 1980, Bobby James Moore committed armed robbery in Houston, Texas. He shot and killed James McCarble, and was subsequently charged for capital murder – a crime punishable by death. He was found guilty by a jury and sentenced to death; in 2001, after an appeal, he was again sentenced to death by a jury. He presented an appeal in 2014, and a hearing was held to determine the existence and scope of his intellectual disability; he had an IQ of just over 70, and the court recommended that his death sentence be either vacated or turned into a life in prison sentence. The Texas Court of Criminal Appeals (CCA) instead affirmed his death sentence based on the factors laid out in Ex parte Briseno.

Legal background 
In Ford v. Wainwright, 477 U.S. 399 (1986), the Supreme Court invalidated the use of capital punishment for those deemed insane. Sixteen years later, in Atkins v. Virginia, 536 U.S. 304 (2002), the Supreme Court held that the Eighth Amendment prohibits the use of capital punishment for those with intellectual disabilities. They ruled in that case that it constituted cruel and unusual punishment, and it allowed individual states to define intellectual disability. States mostly relied on the definitions provided by the American Psychological Association and the American Association on Intellectual and Developmental Disabilities, which generally required for a finding of intellectual disability: that the person has measurable deficit in intelligence; that this deficit impairs certain kinds of social life; and that the deficit emerged prior to adulthood. 

In 2014, the court invalidated rigid cutoff schemes for defining intellectual disabilities in Hall v. Florida, 572 U.S. 701. The lower courts of appeals disagreed on the meaning of Hall; one circuit found that there was no legal definition of intellectual disability, while another said the legal definition was the same as the clinical one.

Decision 
In a 5–3 decision, Associate Justice Ruth Bader Ginsburg delivered the court's opinion. The court held that the Briseno factors violated both Atkins and Hall, and subsequently, that they violated the Eighth Amendment's prohibition against cruel and unusual punishment. In particular, it held that an IQ of 70 was not a rigid cutoff, and that even those with an IQ just above 70 (like Moore) may also be intellectually disabled. It also held that contemporary and "prevailing clinical standards"—not those from 1992, when Texas created its definition—are those at issue in deciding whether a defendant is eligible for the death penalty, and that mild forms of intellectual disability can preclude a death sentence. It remanded the case back to the CCA.

Chief Justice John Roberts dissented, joined by Associate Justices Clarence Thomas and Samuel Alito. He stated that Texas had considered the "prevailing clinical standards" when it crafted its death penalty scheme, and that states had a right to determine their own schemata for defining intellectual disability. He also said the court's reliance on clinical standards, and not moral judgments, was at odds with Eighth Amendment jurisprudence.

Later developments 
On remand in 2018, the CCA again sentenced Moore to death. Moore appealed to the Supreme Court, and they reversed the decision in a per curiam opinion in Moore v. Texas II, 139 S. Ct. 666 (2019). They held that Moore was ineligible for death because of his intellectual disability; Chief Justice Roberts concurred, while Justices Alito, Thomas, and Gorsuch dissented.

As of 2021, there were 28 states that still used the death penalty, and 19 of them cited Moore I or II. Some courts followed Moore I and II clearly, while others did not.

Notes and references

Notes

References

External links
 

United States Supreme Court cases
United States Supreme Court cases of the Roberts Court
2017 in United States case law